Wickenby railway station was a station in Wickenby, Lincolnshire on the line between Lincoln and Grimsby, opened in 1848 and closed in 1965.

References

External links 
 1950s video of diesel unit passing through Wickenby (13-14 mins into video)

Disused railway stations in Lincolnshire
Railway stations in Great Britain opened in 1848
Railway stations in Great Britain closed in 1965
Former Great Central Railway stations